John Govan (16 January 1923 – 17 February 1999) was a Scottish footballer, who played for Hibernian and Ayr United. Govan, who was a key part of the successful post-war Hibs side, was capped six times by Scotland.

Govan grew up in Larkhall, a Lanarkshire town noted for its support of Rangers. He played for the local junior club Larkhall Thistle until he was signed by Hibernian in 1941. This move upset the people in Larkhall, who burned his Hibs training kit. Govan was a full-back, but had an attacking style that was ahead of its time.

Govan broke into the Hibs first team in 1943, eventually forming a partnership with Davie Shaw. This partnership formed the basis of Hibs success after the Second World War, as they won the league championship in 1948. Although Shaw was eventually replaced due to age and injury, Govan continued to enjoy success with Hibs, winning the league again in 1951 and 1952. He was transferred to Ayr United in 1954, where he finished his playing career.

After retiring as a football player, Govan worked as a mining engineer and played lawn bowls in Midlothian. He died in Leith on 17 February 1999, at the age of 76, and was survived by his wife and two children.

References

External links 

Jock Govan, www.ihibs.co.uk

1923 births
1999 deaths
Sportspeople from Larkhall
Association football fullbacks
Scottish footballers
Scotland international footballers
Scottish Football League players
Scottish Junior Football Association players
Hibernian F.C. players
Ayr United F.C. players
Larkhall Thistle F.C. players
Scottish Football League representative players
Footballers from South Lanarkshire